The Cathedral School of St. John the Divine is an independent, Episcopal, K-8 day school for girls and boys of all faiths located in Morningside Heights, Manhattan, New York City. Founded in 1901, it is located on the 13-acre campus of the Cathedral of St. John the Divine and has an enrollment of 300 students. The School is divided into a Lower School (Grades K-4) and an Upper School (Grades 5–8).

Facts and figures

 300 students
 6:1 student to teacher ratio
 78% of faculty members have advanced degrees
 13 acres of academic buildings, gardens, and green space
 2 on-campus playgrounds
 2 on-campus gyms
 33 Upper School Electives, Clubs and Affinity Groups
 18 interscholastic sports teams

History  

The choir school building, now the Cathedral School of St. John the Divine, is located on the eastern border of the cathedral close of St. John the Divine. The building is in the Collegiate Gothic style and is  stories tall. The exterior contains gray schist cladding and limestone trim, with architectural features such as a gabled roof, dormers protruding from the roof, and Tudor-style arched openings. Inside, the building contained classrooms; gathering space for reception, dining; music rooms; a library; a gymnasium; a dormitory; and masters’ and service rooms.

The choir school was created in 1901 within the Ithiel Town Building. A separate structure was first proposed in Walter Cook & Winthrop A. Welch's 1906 plan for the cathedral close. In January 1910, Mary Eliza Blodgett (also known as Mrs. J. Jarrett Blodgett) donated $25,000 toward the new school building's projected $150,000 cost, as a gift to honor her father John H. Sherwood. Blodgett later covered the rest of the choir school building's cost after no one else donated, while former choirboy Frederick G. Bourne provided a $500,000 endowment in 1914. Cathedral architect Ralph Adams Cram approved Cook & Welch's plan in January 1912 and filed construction plans that July, with work beginning that October. The school building was finished in September 1913. The choir school consisted of day school for 20 adult men and a boarding school for 40 choirboys who paid no tuition. It was turned into a boys' day school in 1964 and a coeducational day school for grades K-8 in 1972.

Academics
The Cathedral School's Lower School includes kindergarten through 4th grade, with two homeroom classes in each grade level. Kindergarten through 2nd grade classes have two homeroom teachers, a head teacher and an associate teacher.
Homeroom teachers develop and implement Language Arts, Mathematics, and Social Studies curricula and are responsible for their homeroom class throughout the day. Specialists in each area teach science, art, music, library,
and physical education. Students in kindergarten through 3rd grade study Spanish. Students in the 4th grade take one semester of French and one semester of Spanish, and then choose one language to study in Upper School.

Cathedral School Upper School students take classes in English, math, science, social studies, world languages (Spanish or French), art, music and physical education. Latin is mandatory beginning in the sixth grade. Students also learn coding, digital citizenship and online research skills through the dedicated technology curriculum.

Across all grades and disciplines, STEAM (Science, Technology, Engineering, Art, and Math) is an organic part of the daily academic curriculum at The Cathedral School. Using the National Science Standards as a guide, Lower School students
develop STEAM skills through collaborative learning. In the Upper School, they use those skills as a framework to explore increasingly complex, high-level projects.

Athletics
The Cathedral School offers many sports through the fall, winter, and spring. Interscholastic sports include volleyball, soccer, cross country, basketball, track and field, tennis, softball, and baseball. More than 90% of Upper School students participate in at least one interscholastic sport per school year.

Campus
Three peacocks, which were first donated by the Bronx Zoo in the 1980s, live on the grounds of The Cathedral School.

The school hosts an annual Spring Fair that welcomes the greater New York City community.

Notable alumni
 Jon Abbott, CEO of WGBH Educational Foundation
 Burgess Meredith, actor
 Ben Stiller, actor
 Emma Straub, American novelist 
 Isabel Leonard, Grammy award winner and American mezzo-soprano
 Bethany Donaphin, former WNBA star and current WNBA Head of League Operations
 John Gary, actor, famous for his rendition of Danny Boy, 1930s
Alex Westerman, award-winning creative director based in Los Angeles.
Wiki, record producer and rapper in Ratking

Affiliated organizations
National Association of Independent Schools
New York State Association of Independent Schools

References

External links

 

Educational institutions established in 1901
Private elementary schools in Manhattan
Episcopal schools in the United States
Private middle schools in Manhattan
Morningside Heights, Manhattan
1901 establishments in New York City
Schools in Harlem